Mathias Joseph Alten (February 13, 1871 – March 8, 1938) was a German-American impressionist painter active in Grand Rapids, Michigan.

Career
Born in Gusenburg, Germany, Alten worked as an artist between 1890 and 1938. Although best known for his land- and seascapes he was also an accomplished portrait, floral, and animal painter. William H. Gerdts, a pre-eminent authority on American regional painting, describes Alten's style as that of a "second-generation Impressionist." Alten studied at the acclaimed Académie Julian and at the Académie Colarossi where he won a gold medal for the best figure drawing.  As early in his career as 1905, Alten was being invited to show his paintings in museum exhibits. During his lifetime, his work was exhibited at the National Academy in New York, the Art Institute of Chicago, the Corcoran Gallery in Washington, D.C., the Pennsylvania Academy of the Fine Arts, the Detroit Institute of Art and other smaller venues.

As catalogs from those aforementioned exhibits show, Alten's paintings hung among the works of acclaimed artists such as Childe Hassam, Edward Henry Potthast, Charles Russell, H.O. Tanner, Frederic Remington, O.E. Berninghaus, George Bellows, J.S. Sargent, E.L. Blumenschein, Thomas Eakins, William Merritt Chase, and William Wendt – as well as those of his similarly distinguished friends - H.R. Poore of Old Lyme, Connecticut, and E.I. Couse of Taos, New Mexico.

According to Gerdts, "By 1898 Alten appears to have felt the need for greater professional training and exposure … to more cosmopolitan experience in artistic craftsmanship and association." He made a number of voyages to Europe; first to study his craft in Paris (with the help of wealthy patrons) in 1899. Then, attracted to the Hague School of Dutch artists, he spent 1910-11 working in the Netherlands amidst the settings favored by the Maris brothers, Jozef Israëls, Willem Roelofs, and even Vincent van Gogh and Piet Mondriaan's (Eng. "Mondrian") early work. Later, Alten fell under the influence of the work of Spanish painter Joaquín Sorolla. Several working trips to Spain followed.

An exhibit of Alten's sun-drenched canvasses from the 1920s was held at the Holt Galleries in New York City. The Literary Digest for October 12, 1929, featured the showing with an article and a reproduction of one of the Spanish marine scenes on its front cover. This was perhaps the high point of Alten's national recognition.

Alten's career entailed an astounding amount of travel; especially given the conditions at the time – sea voyages, less than luxurious trains, horse-drawn carriages ... even donkeys. He frequently visited noted art colonies such as Étaples in France; Old Lyme, Connecticut; Taos, New Mexico; Laguna Beach, California and Tarpon Springs, Florida. But, although Alten painted alongside fellow artists, he never became a resident member of any artists' colony. Nor did he formally, by designation or choice, become a follower of specific "schools" such as the Fauves in France or the Ashcan School of the Depression era.

Alten continued his working trips within the US well into the 1930s, traveling to both coasts, Florida, Taos and always within his beloved West Michigan. His subject matter was notably diverse; landscapes, still lifes, seascapes, animals and portraits - often of judges throughout Michigan, as well as other notables as far afield as California and Oregon.

His style evolved in accordance with both the tastes of the times and his own preferences. He never felt pressure to veer into the overtly "modernist" style which artists of the generation after his frequently embraced.

Over the years, various local (West Michigan) arts-affiliated organizations named Alten as an honorary member. Regional and national organizations sought his membership as well. By 1904, he had joined the pioneering Society of Western Artists, one of the era's most influential art organizations. And, in 1916, he was invited to become a member of the National Arts Club in New York. In addition, Alten was a longtime member of Detroit's prestigious Scarab Club by which he was awarded a gold medal for his art in 1920.

According to James A. Straub, the compiler of his Catalogue Raisonne, Alten is often referred to as the "dean of Michigan painters." Alten died, at age 67, on March 8, 1938, at 1593 East Fulton Street in Grand Rapids, Michigan. That home is now listed on the National Register of Historic Places.

References

External links
 Mathias J. Alten at American Art Gallery
Mathias J. Alten Papers at Grand Valley State University
Mathias J. Alten Digital Collection at Grand Valley State University
Mathias J. Alten Catalogue Raisonné

Archives of American Art
Mathias Joseph Alten exhibition catalog, 1979
Mathias Joseph Alten scrapbook, 1920-1965

1871 births
1938 deaths
Académie Julian alumni
Académie Colarossi alumni
American Impressionist painters
19th-century American painters
American male painters
20th-century American painters
Artists from Grand Rapids, Michigan
American expatriates in France
German emigrants to the United States
19th-century American male artists
20th-century American male artists